The Cave Boy of the Age of Stone is a classic heavily illustrated educational children's novel aimed at a juvenile audience or reader published in 1907 by author Margaret A. McIntyre and illustrated by Irma Deremeaux which is currently available in digital formats from multiple sources. By 2007, the work had entered the public domain and several reprint publishers on three continents<ref
 name="Abesinfo-2">Editions, by list inspection find new (2007) Australian and United States Hardback editions and one, possibly two paperback editions, the certain one printed in the United Kingdom (IndyPublish. PAPERBACK. (new)), retrieval date: 2009-03-06.</ref> have brought out new editions varying considerably in quality and workmanship, including at least one with the many original line drawings (Etchings) reproduced throughout (See list below) in a high quality hardcover edition.

Synopsis

The story line focuses on two young brothers and their family group while attempting to educate the young reader in a picture of what life was likely like for Cavemen. In the earliest part of the narrative, the author introduces the idea of domestication of animals, because a tethered kid (goat offspring) had become gentled and docile—so much so they put their toddler sister on its back for a ride. Moving forward, the novel describes all the major milestones featured during the stone age such as the discovery of fire, the creation of weapons,  hunting/ foraging for food, cooking that food, as well as how and why man learnt how to swim.

Chapters list

Illustrations

As is characteristic of many quality works by the publishers of the first US and UK editions, the work is heavily illustrated with engravings, some of which are illustrated below.

References

External links

The Cave Boy of the Age of Stone at Project Gutenberg
The Cave Boy of the Age of Stone at Google Books
The Cave Boy of the Age of Stone at archive.org.
 

1907 American novels
Children's historical novels
American children's novels
Novels set in prehistory
D. Appleton & Company books
1907 children's books
George G. Harrap and Co. books